Sanicula bipinnatifida is a species of flowering plant in the parsley family known by the common names purple sanicle, purple blacksnakeroot, and shoe buttons. It is native to the west coast of North America from British Columbia to Baja California, where it can be found in many types of habitat, including grassland, woodlands, and mountain slopes of serpentine soils.

Description

It is a perennial herb growing to a maximum height near 60 centimeters from a taproot. It is bright green to dark purple in color. The leaves are borne on long petioles, measuring up to 19 centimeters long with blades divided into several toothed lobes. The inflorescence is made up of one or more heads of bisexual and male-only flowers with tiny, curving, reddish, purple, or yellow petals. The prickly fruits are a few millimeters long.

References

External links

 Calflora Database: Sanicula bipinnatifida (Purple sanicle,  Snakeroot)
Jepson Manual Treatment
USDA Plants Profile
Washington Burke Museum
U.C. Photos gallery

bipinnatifida
Flora of British Columbia
Flora of California
Flora of Baja California
Flora of the West Coast of the United States
Flora of the Sierra Nevada (United States)
Natural history of the California chaparral and woodlands
Natural history of the California Coast Ranges
Natural history of the Central Valley (California)
Natural history of the Peninsular Ranges
Flora without expected TNC conservation status